The Ilik River Fortification I near Yona, Guam was built by Japanese forces during World War II.  It was listed on the U.S. National Register of Historic Places in 1991.

The National Park Service's website reports that the PDF document which would describe the site is not available online, but it provides a photo from 1986 with location identified as "Ylig River Caves" and showing "floor of trench and cave".

See also
National Register of Historic Places listings in Guam

References

Buildings and structures on the National Register of Historic Places in Guam
World War II on the National Register of Historic Places in Guam
1940s establishments in Guam